Brazilian gaucho music (in Portuguese música gaúcha brasileira or música nativista) denotes the traditional music of Río Grande do Sul, Santa Catarina and Paraná states, whose population has a strong ancestry of European countries like Portugal, Spain, Italy and Germany. The word gaucho refers to the countryside and farm people.

History

In the 19th century, in the north of the state of Rio Grande do Sul, Brazil, the tropeiros, men who led the cattle troops, often created music for fun, to sing while they stumbled, they were songs with simple lyrics, but with time, and the arrival of the accordion in Brazil, these songs gained their own dances.  Today, they are gaúcho folkloric songs and dances, as there is no record of the composers of the songs and the creators of the dances.

With the emergence of the Farroupilha Revolution, also known as the Farrapos War, these dances ended up being forgotten for years, receiving only a brief revival in late nineteenth century's parties. In 1940, the folklorist João Carlos D'avila Paixão Cõrtes, better known as Paixão Côrtes, Gathered a group of friends to rescue these songs and dances, and through a lot of work, they got many answers from elderly people. In 1943, the first song from Rio Grande do Sul was recorded: it is called "Adeus Mariana", performed by singer and composer Pedro Raymundo, and was inspired by country music. In 1948, after further research, Paixão Côrtes and his friends created the first Centro de Tradições Gaúchas (known throughout Brazil through the acronym "CTG"), where  people gather for traditional events, involving music and dance. At this point many folk songs were rescued, and in 1950, the first folk music from Rio Grande do Sul was recorded, "Rancheira de Carreirinha", recorded by Ivan Lessa.

Each folk song has its dance, as they were forgotten for years, when they were rescued by Paixão Cõrtes and his friends, many dances needed to receive small modifications to help people memorize the steps.

In 1958 with the foundation of CTG Rincão Serrano in Carazinho RS, these customs were already very popular in the state of Rio Grande do Sul and it was already arriving in the state of Santa Catarina, not only music and dance, but also clothing, as well. like the gaucho of Uruguay, the clothing of the gaucho of Brazil is similar, Bombacha (Pants), boots, scarf around the neck, hat and on cold days, the use of the poncho or the visor are two similar garments that are suitable for winter .

The songs of the  gaucho music  present themes from the gaucho folk traditions, such as: countryside, farm, horse, moral values and regional cuisine. Some songs are built in a slow way, others in a more agitated way, always following the familiar rhythms, Xote, Valsa and Milonga are slow rhythms, Chamamé, Vaneira and Bugio are more agitated.

Having the influence of folk music, by singer Pedro Raymundo, and the duo Irmãos Bertussi, several gaúcho artists emerged singing their own songs in the same style. Gaucho music follows various rhythms, Waltz, Tango, Rancheira, Vaneira, Chamamé, Xote, and the only rhythm created in Rio Grande do Sul, the Bugio. The folk songs also follow these rhythms, the "Xote Carreirinho" as the title says, is in the rhythm of Xote, the "Pezinho" is in the Ritmo de Valsa and the "Rancheira de Carreirinha" is a Rancheira as the title itself it says.

Gaucho music became popular worldwide in 1960 as singer and composer Teixeirinha, born in Rolante, Rio Grande do Sul, Teixeirinha released the song "Coração de Luto" in 1959, the song talks about his childhood, in 1960 it sold 1 million of copies in South America and Portugal, until 1965 it had sold 3 million copies throughout America, Europe and some countries in Africa and Asia. Today Teixeirinha is considered the greatest singer from Rio Grande do Sul and regionalist, with more than 130 million albums sold worldwide.

Gaucho music stands out a lot in ballads, where two or more singers get together and sing rhymed verses in the improvisation, attacking each other, a musical fight made to amuse the people, two singers stand out in the gaucho trova, Gildo de Freitas and José Portella Delavy, Gildo de Freitas is considered the King of the Troubadours, and Delavy is considered the Master of the Troubadours. Currently, a great grandson of Delavy named Samuel Delavy is pursuing a career in Rock.

In addition to Teixeirinha, Gildo de Freitas and José Portella Delavy, other great artists and bands stand out such as Baitaca, Porca Véia, Os Bertussi (band created by the Bertussi Brothers after their success as a duo), Mano Lima, Mary Terezinha, Berenice Azambuja, Shana Muller and others.

Some of the musical instruments used in the genre are accordion, guitar, violin and bombo legüero.

Festivals

As of 1971, the California da Canção Nativa appeared in Uruguaiana, a festival considered to be the mother of all nativist festivals, giving rise to nativist music festivals in the states of Santa Catarina, Paraná and Rio Grande do Sul.

After the California of Native Song emerged:
Escaramuça da Canção Gaudéria
Seara da Canção Nativista
Ponche Verde da canção Gaúcha
Tertúlia Musical Nativista
Festival da Barranca
Coxilha Nativista
Musicanto Sul-americano de Nativismo
Tafona da Canção Nativa
Acorde da Canção Nativa
Sapecada da Canção Nativa
Um Canto para Martín Fierro
Gauderiada da Canção Gaúcha
Encontro Internacional de Chamameceros
Carijo da Canção Gaúcha
Salamanca da Canção Nativa
Canoa do Canto Nativo
Acampamento da Canção Nativa
Galponeira
Serra, Campo e Cantiga
Bicuíra da Canção Nativa

Most popular artists 

Teixeirinha
Gildo de Freitas
José Portella Delavy
Baitaca
Pedro Otaça
Formiguinha
Pedro Raymundo
José Mendes
Gaúcho da Fronteira
Porca Véia
Mary Terezinha
Shana Muller
Mano Lima
Teixeirinha Filho
Teixeirinha Neto
Leonardo
Leopoldo Raisser
Luiz Marenco
Cerejinha
Bruna Scopel
Augusto Camargo
Velho Milongueiro
Luiz Marenco
Adelar Bertussi
Gilnei Bertussi
Paulinho Mixaria
João Luiz Corrêa
Joca Martins
Luiz Carlos Borges
Marcelo do Tchê

Most Popular Bands and Duos 
Teixeirinha and Mary Terezinha
Os Serranos
Os Bertussi
Os Farrapos
As Maragatas
Os Monarcas
Os Mirins
Zézinho e Julieta
Gauchinhas Missioneiras
Grupo Minuano
Grupo Soledade
Buenas Tchê
Gauchinhas Missioneiras
Conjunto Fogo de Chão
Garotas do Tchê
Garotos de Ouro
Tchê Garotos
Antônio Gringo e os Quatro Ventos
Os Milongueiros
Nelson e Janete
Oswaldir e Carlos Magrão
Grupo Rodeio
César Oliveira e Rogério Melo
Grupo Tradição
Os Mateadores
Machado e Marcelo do Tchê
Tchê Guri
Tchê Barbaridade

Music Symbols Gauchos
Gaucho music is the musical style that has the most successes considered symbols in Brazil, several artists stand out for their successes and many of the successes fall in people's admiration, as is the case of the song "Querência Amada" by singer Teixeirinha, released in 1975, until today is considered the second anthem of the state of Rio Grande do Sul, the song talks about the singer's admiration for the gaucho tradition, situating important people in the history of Brazil, people who were born in Rio Grande do Sul, like the former president Getúlio Vargas, the lawyer Borges de Medeiros and the lawyer Flores da Cunha, in addition to quoting the beauties of Rio Grande do Sul in a poetical way that stirred the emotions of millions of people across the country, thanks to Teixeirinha, the culture Gaucho is appreciated throughout Brazil, even in states with different cultures, the Gauchos are remembered.

Another success considered a symbol of gaucho music, and also a state anthem, is the song "Céu, Sol, Sul, Terra e Cor" by singer and composer Jader Moreci Teixeira, better known as Leonardo Gaucho, the song talks about the beauties of the state and values of the people of Rio Grande do Sul, talking about God as well.

Other songs stand out as a symbol for talking about the people of Rio Grande do Sul, their customs and values, such as "Do Fundo da Grota" by singer Baitaca, "Desasssegos" by singer João Chagas Leite, "Eu Reconheço ue Sou um Grosso" by singer Gildo de Freitas and others.

References

External links
Nativist Movement - In Portuguese
Schreiner, Claus. Música Brasileira. Marion Boyars Publishers Ltd (2000). 

Brazilian music